K87 or K-87 may refer to:

K-87 (Kansas highway), a state highway in Kansas
INS Nashak (K87), a former Indian Navy ship
HMS Marigold (K87), a former UK Royal Navy ship